Candling is a method used in embryology to study the growth and development of an embryo inside an egg. The method uses a bright light source behind the egg to show details through the shell, and is so called because the original sources of light used were candles.

The technique of using light to examine eggs is used in the egg industry to assess the quality of edible eggs.

In plants

This technique can also be used to assess the quality and development stage of certain translucent plant seeds, especially those of Lilies and their close relatives. Ripe, viable seeds have a visible embryo within them when viewed in transmitted light, so good seeds can be sorted out from the non-viable seeds and chaff, if desired. Candling is a highly useful method with certain species that germinate erratically or very slowly, as seed germination causes the embryo to enlarge. Candling can thus be used to estimate the optimal time for planting seeds that are being stratified. Care must be taken during candling, as drying or overheating will kill the developing seeds.

In lutherie

In lutherie, candling is sometimes used to check the thickness of the soundboard in various places, especially on lutes and historical guitars. This is especially necessary because these instruments have soundboards which vary in thickness, for instance the area where the rose is carved. It is also used to check for any flaws in the wood, or to check how tight a joint is, for instance on the centre seam of the soundboard.

Traditionally, a candle would be used, hence the name, but usually nowadays a modern light is used, as this is less of a fire risk.

References

External links
Pacific Bulb Society – Information about candling lily seeds
Candling and grading manual for shell eggs – 1951 publication on egg candling by Kansas State Board of Agriculture

Poultry farming